The APRA billion streams list or The 1,000,000,000 list was established in 2019 by APRA AMCOS (Australasian Performing Right Association and Australasian Mechanical Copyright Owners Society) to acknowledge Australasian songwriters whose works have achieved one billion (1,000,000,000) streams on various services. Streaming services used for the list include Apple Music, Amazon Music, Google Play, Spotify, Vevo, and YouTube.

Australian-born singer-songwriter Sia is the most prolific writer on the list, with a total of 15 entries, as from October 2022.

References

External links
 

21st century-related lists
APRA Awards
Lists of Internet-related superlatives
Music-related lists